Andha Naal is a 1996 Tamil-language mystery-thriller film directed by Vishnu Priyan. The film stars Prem Menon, Raja, Anandaraj and Mohini, with Vennira Aadai Moorthy, Charle and Alex playing supporting roles. It was released on 11 October 1996. The film is partially inspired from the 1954 cut film Andha Naal.

Plot

The film begins with the church Father James (Anandaraj) digging up a coffin in the graveyard in the middle of the night. Father James finds inside the coffin, a dead body of Babu (Raja) stabbed in the heart with a knife, so he immediately calls the police. The police inspector Rangaraj after seeing the dead body decided to hush up the issue and buried the coffin. The news was spread rapidly and it is now on the front pages of every newspaper. Very quickly, the police were being heavily criticised for smothering up the sordid affair.

SP Vikramadithyan (Prem Menon) decides to take up himself in this sordid case. He digs up the coffin and sends the corpse to the post-mortem examination. Vikramadithyan first examines the Church Father James and James tells what happened in the past.

Babu (Raja) was a spoiled student specialist in ragging other students and in annoying the professors. Babu clashed many times with his classmate Mary (Mohini) who was a soft-spoken student and a religious person. Being an orphan, she was brought up by Father James. Babu slowly fell in love with her, he became a good man and he eventually converted to Christianity. Finally, Vincent Babu and Mary got married at the church with the blessings of Father James. At the wedding night, Babu shews his true colours. He was, in fact, a drunkard and a womanizer, he acted as a good man all along only for spending time with Mary one night and he left her the next day. Many years later, Babu reappeared as a melancholic man who lost all his wealth and asked Father James for forgiveness. Mary had a boy called Alex (Master Nadim Khan). Alex forced his mother Mary to live with Babu who had not changed at all. Babu's behaviors became worse : he behaved badly with the school teacher Poornitha (Raksha) in public, he spent time with a prostitute (Shakeela), he even tried to seduce Lakshmi (Kavitha) who resurfaced to see her daughter Mary, he drank a lot of alcohols in a bar owned by (Alex) and worst that he molested his wife and beat up his son. One night, Father James was informed of Babu's death and they all proceed to his funeral the same evening. When a worker tried to hammer the first nail in the coffin, the hammer fell from the hands and hit Babu's chest. Babu opened his eyes briefly and Father James noticed it.

Vikramadithyan is now determined to find the culprit. What transpires next forms the rest of the story.

Cast

Prem Menon as Vikramadithyan
Raja as Vincent Babu
Anandaraj as Father James
Mohini as Mary
Vennira Aadai Moorthy as College Professor
Charle as Vincent Babu's friend
Alex as Bar Owner
Jai Ganesh as Vikramadithyan's father
Master Nadim Khan as Alex
CID Shakuntala as Vikramadithyan's mother 
Kavitha as Lakshmi
Raksha as Poornitha
Shakeela
Manager Cheena
Thyagu as Kandu
Pandu as Subbu
Kumarimuthu as David
Jyothi Meena
Singamuthu as Muthusamy
Bayilvan Ranganathan
Tirupur Ramasamy
Chandrasekhar

Soundtrack

The film score and the soundtrack were composed by Soundaryan. The soundtrack, released in 1996, features 6 tracks with lyrics written by Piraisoodan, Visali Kannadasan and Soundaryan.

References

1996 films
1990s Tamil-language films
1990s mystery thriller films
Indian crime thriller films
1996 crime thriller films
Indian mystery thriller films